Harwich and North Essex  is a constituency represented in the House of Commons of the UK Parliament by Bernard Jenkin of the Conservative Party since its creation in 2010.

History 
The seat was created for the 2010 general election following a review of the Parliamentary representation of Essex by the Boundary Commission for England.  It was formed from the majority of the abolished constituency of North Essex, together with the town of Harwich and surrounding areas, previously part of the abolished Harwich constituency, with the remainder of the Harwich seat creating the new seat of Clacton.

Jenkin was previously Member of Parliament for North Essex.

Boundaries

The District of Tendring wards of Alresford, Ardleigh and Little Bromley, Bradfield, Wrabness and Wix, Brightlingsea, Great and Little Oakley, Great Bentley, Harwich and Kingsway, Lawford, Manningtree, Mistley, Little Bentley and Tendring, Ramsey and Parkeston, and Thorrington, Frating, Elmstead and Great Bromley; and the Borough of Colchester wards of Dedham and Langham, East Donyland, Fordham and Stour, Great Tey, Pyefleet, West Bergholt and Eight Ash Green, West Mersea, Wivenhoe Cross, and Wivenhoe Quay.

Constituency profile
The constituency maintains a strong maritime connection, containing the eponymous port and town of Harwich which offers regular ferry services to the Hook of Holland (Hoek van Holland).  Deprivation in terms of low income and unemployment exists in the Dovercourt, Parkeston and station neighbourhoods of Harwich itself and south of Brightlingsea whereas the other villages and towns (down to localised Output Areas of a few hundred homes) fall above the national average on the same measures.

Members of Parliament

Elections

For results prior to the boundary review, see Harwich and North Essex

Elections in the 2010s

* Served as an MP in the 2005–2010 Parliament

See also
List of parliamentary constituencies in Essex

Notes

References

Parliamentary constituencies in Essex
Constituencies of the Parliament of the United Kingdom established in 2010
Harwich